The Big Fix may refer to:

 The Big Fix (1947 film), an American crime film directed by James Flood
 The Big Fix (1978 film), a comedy-thriller film directed by Jeremy Kagan
 The Big Fix (2012 film), a documentary film surrounding the Deepwater Horizon oil spill
 "The Big Fix" (South Park), a 2022 episode of the American TV series South Park

See also 
 A Big Fix, a 2005 book by Ian Lowe